This is a list of provinces of Argentina by life expectancy. Life expectancy is the average number of years of age that a group of infants born in the same year can expect to live, if maintained, from birth. The data is from a 2020 report by the Pacific Disaster Center.

Life expectancy in 2018

See also
 List of South American countries by life expectancy

References 

Ranked lists of country subdivisions
Argentina